Kyle Andrew Walker (born 28 May 1990) is an English professional footballer who plays as a right-back for  club Manchester City and the England national team. Known for his incredible recovery pace, strength and vision, Walker is often considered to be one of the best right-backs of his generation.

Walker started his career at his boyhood club Sheffield United which he had joined at the age of seven. He was promoted to the first-team where he made his full Sheffield United debut at 18 years old against Leyton Orient after a loan spell at Northampton Town. He impressed whilst playing for the Blades and played in the 2009 Championship play-off final in their defeat against Burnley. His performances earned him a move to Premier League club Tottenham Hotspur, before being immediately loaned back to Sheffield United. After further loan spells at Queens Park Rangers and Aston Villa, he cemented his place in Tottenham's first team. His performances earned him a call-up to the England national team where he made his debut against Spain. After five more seasons at Tottenham, Walker joined Manchester City for a fee of £45 million. He has since won four Premier League titles, four EFL Cup trophies and one FA Cup whilst at City. He has also played for England at UEFA Euro 2016, the 2018 FIFA World Cup and UEFA Euro 2020. He has been named in the PFA Team of the Year three times in: 2011–12, 2016–17 and 2017–18.

Early life
Walker was born in Sheffield, South Yorkshire, and is of Jamaican descent. He grew up in the Sharrow area of the city, and attended Porter Croft Infant & Junior School, followed by High Storrs School until 2006.

Club career

Sheffield United
Walker joined boyhood club Sheffield United, at the age of seven after being recommended by coach Paul Archer at Football Unites, Racism Divides and progressed through the ranks to become a regular fixture in the reserves by 2008. In November 2008, he was allowed to join League One club Northampton Town on a one-month loan to gain first-team experience, making his debut on 15 November 2008 in a defeat by Oldham Athletic. His one-month loan was later extended into January, before he eventually returned to Bramall Lane having played nine matches for the Cobblers.

Soon after returning to his parent club, Walker made his full debut for Sheffield United on 13 January 2009, starting in a third round FA Cup tie against Leyton Orient. With the Blades losing a number of players to injury in the closing weeks of the season, Walker was a surprise inclusion in the starting line up for the crucial last two matches of the season, making his full league debut for the club on 25 April 2009 against Swansea City. After two outstanding performances he retained his place as Sheffield United entered the play–offs, starting both matches against Preston North End and the final against Burnley at the end of May 2009. By playing in the final, Walker became the youngest Sheffield United player ever to play at Wembley Stadium.

Tottenham Hotspur
On 22 July 2009, Walker left Sheffield United to join Tottenham Hotspur along with fellow defender Kyle Naughton for a combined fee of £9 million, but was loaned back to United for the duration of the 2009–10 season as part of the deal. While at Bramall Lane he was virtually ever-present at right-back for the first half of the season but was unexpectedly recalled back to Spurs on 1 February 2010, just before the close of the January 2010 transfer window, after Alan Hutton was loaned out to Sunderland. Walker made his debut for Tottenham on Saturday 27 March 2010, in a 2–0 victory over Portsmouth and went on to make one more league appearance that season.

At the start of the following season, Walker went out on loan once more signing an initial six-month deal with Queens Park Rangers (QPR) due to injuries at the club in the right-back position. In mid-October, his loan was extended until 3 January 2011.

After he had left QPR, Walker joined Aston Villa on loan until the end of the 2010–11 season. He scored on his debut only nine minutes into the match against former club Sheffield United in the third round of the FA Cup in January 2011. At the start of February, Walker scored his first Premier League goal and first senior league goal, a 30-yard strike low into the left corner against Fulham. He returned to his parent club at the end of the 2010–11 season after scoring two goals in 18 appearances in all competitions for Aston Villa.

On leaving Villa Park, Walker suggested that he would be happy to return to the club the next season, for his first-team opportunities at Spurs were limited, but Tottenham Hotspur manager Harry Redknapp had already stated that he did not wish to sell the defender. Walker subsequently agreed to a contract extension at Tottenham until 2016. Walker was chosen in the starting eleven for Tottenham's opening match of the 2011–12 season, against Manchester United at Old Trafford on 22 August 2011. On 2 October, he scored the winning goal in the North London derby against Arsenal from 25-yards out. Tottenham won the match 2–1.

On 22 April 2012, Walker was named as the PFA Young Player of the Year, beating the likes of Sergio Agüero, Danny Welbeck, Daniel Sturridge, Alex Oxlade-Chamberlain and teammate Gareth Bale to the award, as well as being named in the PFA Team of the Year. On 29 April, he scored a free kick from 25 yards to help Tottenham beat Blackburn Rovers 2–0 at White Hart Lane. On 3 May 2012, Walker was awarded with a new five-year contract, that ran until 2017.

Walker's performance against Manchester United in March 2012 saw him at fault for two of the opposition's goals in a 3–1 defeat. He began his next season in a similar vein; he was at fault for Chelsea's 4th goal in the 4–2 defeat at White Hart Lane, getting shrugged off the ball easily by Juan Mata. He was ever-present in the first half of the season in the Premier League, with the exception of the 3–0 victory over Fulham at Craven Cottage; this included playing 90 minutes in the 3–2 win over Manchester United, which was Tottenham's first victory at Old Trafford in 23 years.

On 28 October 2013, it was announced that Walker had signed a new contract with Tottenham, keeping him at the club until 2019.

Walker was part of the team that lost 2–0 to Chelsea at Wembley Stadium in the 2015 League Cup Final on 1 March.

On 8 August 2015, Walker was involved in an own goal which led to Tottenham suffering a defeat in the hands of Manchester United in the season opener and it also became the first goal of the new season.

On 20 April 2017, Walker was named as right-back in the PFA Team of the Year for the second time.

Manchester City
On 14 July 2017, Walker signed a five-year contract with Tottenham's Premier League rivals Manchester City, in a transfer reported to be worth an initial £45 million fee, rising to £50 million with add-ons, making it one of the most expensive football transfers.

He made his competitive debut for City against Brighton on 12 August 2017, a game where many media outlets labelled him as the best player. However, during Walker's home debut for Manchester City he was sent off for two yellow card offences against Everton, which was thought to be a harsh decision by referee Bobby Madley. Walker was selected and part of the squad that beat Arsenal 3–0 at Wembley Stadium in the 2018 EFL Cup Final to claim his and City's first trophy of the 2017–18 season.

Walker signed a new contract with the club in June 2019.

On 6 November 2019, in a Champions League away match against Atalanta, Walker volunteered to go in goal for the last 10 minutes after substitute goalkeeper Claudio Bravo was sent off; he did not concede as the match ended 1–1.

On 5 April 2020, the club began a disciplinary procedure against Walker after it was reported that he had broken national lockdown rules and invited two sex workers to his home amid the global coronavirus pandemic. On 7 May 2020, it was again reported that he had broken lockdown rules by travelling to Sheffield to give a present to his sister and hugging her. He later admitted that he also visited his parents to pick up food. Manchester City said they would not discipline him for this, citing the trips being for personal reasons. He later tweeted that he felt he and his family were being harassed and that the reports were affecting the mental health of his whole family.

International career
Before having even made a league appearance for Sheffield United, Walker was called up to the England U19s in February 2009. He made his début on 10 February, coming on as a second-half substitute in a 3–0 loss to Spain U19s. Following his first run of regular Premier League starts, Walker was called up to the full England squad in February 2011 and again in March 2011. However, he did not feature in any of the matches played, and pulled out of the squad in March due to an injury.

At the end of the 2010–11 season, Walker was named as part of the England squad that competed in the 2011 UEFA European Under-21 Championship competition in Denmark. Despite the poor showing of the team, who were knocked out in the first round, Walker was named in the Team of the Tournament.

His good form in the 2011–12 season saw him make his senior England début in the 1–0 win over Spain, coming on for Scott Parker as a substitute in the 85th minute. He made his first start on 15 November, in a 1–0 win against Sweden, after which he was the man-of-the-match. He missed the 2012 European Championships because of a toe injury, suffered in a league match against Fulham.

Walker played the first England match after Euro 2012, a 2–1 win against Italy.

He was named in the 23-man England national team squad for the 2018 World Cup. Walker was deployed as a centre-back in a back three by England's manager Gareth Southgate.

In June 2019, he scored an own goal against the Netherlands national team as England went out at the semi-final stage of the 2019 UEFA Nations League. He was not selected for England's squad for the European Championship qualifiers at the start of the 2019–20 season. On 5 September 2020, he was sent off in a 1–0 Nations League win away to Iceland, the first Englishman to get an international red card since Raheem Sterling in June 2014.

On 1 June 2021. Walker was named in the 26-man squad for the rescheduled UEFA Euro 2020. His performances during the tournament earned him a place in the UEFA Euro 2020 Team of the Tournament as England made it to their first final in a major tournament since 1966.

Style of play
Kyle Walker is renowned for his speed and strength and has been identified by Neymar as one of the toughest opponents he has ever faced.

Sponsorship
In December 2012, Walker signed a boot deal with Nike to wear the T90 Laser IV which were also worn by Wayne Rooney. From 2009 to 2012, he wore the SX Valor, SX Flare, Stealth Pro, Speciali, Stealth Pro II, GT Pro, and GT Pro II boots by Umbro. Walker is currently sponsored by Puma.

Career statistics

Club

International

Honours
Queens Park Rangers
Football League Championship: 2010–11

Tottenham Hotspur
Football League Cup runner-up: 2014–15

Manchester City
Premier League: 2017–18, 2018–19, 2020–21, 2021–22
FA Cup: 2018–19
EFL Cup: 2017–18, 2018–19, 2019–20, 2020–21
FA Community Shield: 2018, 2019
UEFA Champions League runner-up: 2020–21

England U19
UEFA European Under-19 Championship runner-up: 2009

England
UEFA European Championship runner-up: 2020
UEFA Nations League third place: 2018–19

Individual
UEFA European Under-21 Championship Team of the Tournament: 2011
PFA Young Player of the Year: 2011–12
PFA Team of the Year: 2011–12 Premier League, 2016–17 Premier League, 2017–18 Premier League
UEFA European Championship Team of the Tournament: 2020

References

External links

Profile at the Manchester City F.C. website
Profile at the Football Association website

1990 births
Living people
Footballers from Sheffield
English footballers
Association football defenders
Sheffield United F.C. players
Northampton Town F.C. players
Tottenham Hotspur F.C. players
Queens Park Rangers F.C. players
Aston Villa F.C. players
Manchester City F.C. players
English Football League players
Premier League players
FA Cup Final players
England youth international footballers
England under-21 international footballers
England international footballers
UEFA Euro 2016 players
2018 FIFA World Cup players
UEFA Euro 2020 players
2022 FIFA World Cup players
Outfield association footballers who played in goal
Black British sportsmen
English people of Jamaican descent
People educated at High Storrs School